Wyke Regis Halt was a small railway station on the Portland Branch Railway in the west of the English county of Dorset. Opened in July 1909, it was part of a scheme that saw several halts opened on the GWR with services provided by Railmotors to counter road competition.

The station closed with the branch in 1952.

The site today
The former trackbed of the line is a popular walk called the Rodwell Trail, and the platform is still there in a shallow cutting .

Further reading

External links
 Wyke Regis Halt station on navigable 1945 O. S. map (located just north of Ferry Bridge)

Disused railway stations in Dorset
Former Weymouth and Portland Railway stations
Railway stations in Great Britain opened in 1909
Railway stations in Great Britain closed in 1952